Jim Boles (February 28, 1914 – May 26, 1977) was an American actor. He appeared in the films The Tattooed Stranger, The Man with My Face, Naked in the Sun, Fluffy, The Ghost and Mr. Chicken, The Trouble with Angels, A Big Hand for the Little Lady, Waterhole No. 3, With Six You Get Eggroll, Angel in My Pocket, The Love God?, Ace Eli and Rodger of the Skies, Doctor Death: Seeker of Souls, Nightmare Honeymoon, Jacqueline Susann's Once Is Not Enough and The Great Texas Dynamite Chase, among others.

He died of a heart attack on May 26, 1977, in Sherman Oaks, Los Angeles, California at age 63.

Filmography

References

External links
 

1914 births
1977 deaths
20th-century American male actors
American male film actors